Cuvieronius is an extinct New World genus of gomphothere, named after the French naturalist Georges Cuvier, which ranged from southern North America to eastern South America. Amongst the last gomphotheres, it became extinct at the end of the Pleistocene, approximately 12,000 years ago, following the arrival of humans to the Americas.

Taxonomy 
The species now known as Cuvieronius hyodon was among the first fossil animals from the New World to be studied. The first remains of this species were recovered from Ecuador by Alexander von Humboldt, at a location the local population referred to as the "Field of Giants". Humboldt recognized that, rather than being bones of giant humans as had been thought by the local population and previous Spanish colonists, they were similar to the giant elephants (Mastodon) being described from Ohio. Humboldt sent teeth that he had collected from Mexico, Ecuador, and Chile to French anatomist Georges Cuvier, who classified the teeth into two species, which he referred to as the "mastodonte des cordilières" and the "mastodonte humboldtien", in an 1806 paper. It was not until 1824 that Cuvier formally named the species. He referred both to the genus Mastodon, calling them M. andium and M. humboldtii.

Unknown to Cuvier, Fischer had, in 1814, already named the two species based on Cuvier's original description, in the new genus Mastotherium as M. hyodon and M. humboldtii. The idea of two distinct species continued to be accepted into the 20th century, usually using Cuvier's names, though Fischer's names were older. In 1923, Henry Fairfield Osborn recognized that these species were distinct from Mastodon, and assigned each to its own new genus, as Cuvieronius humboldtii and Cordillerion andium. However, by the 1930s, general agreement had shifted to regard both forms as representing a single, geographically widespread species, with Cuvieronius humboldtii considered to be the correct name. During the 1950s, the nomenclature of this species became increasingly tangled, as various scientists regarded the type species of the genus Cuvieronius to be Fischer's first published name Mastotherium hyodon, rather than the originally designated Mastodon humboldtii. This situation went unaddressed until 2009, when Spencer Lucas petitioned the International Commission on Zoological Nomenclature to officially change the type species of Cuvieronius to M. hyodon as had been followed for over 50 years by that time, rather than abandoning the well-known Cuvieronius as a synonym. In 2011, Opinion 2276 of the ICZN ruled to conserve the names.

The species level taxonomy of Cuvieronius is confused, historically, several species were recognised, typically C. tropicus and C. hyodon for North and South American remains, respectively, but recent scholarship suggests that there is only a single valid species, C. hyodon.

Description 

The skull was relatively long and low-vaulted. The upper tusks were straight to slightly curved, and had a spiral shaped-enamel band. The lower tusks present in more primitive gomphotheres were vestigial in Cuvieronius, being only present in young juveniles, and the lower jaw shortened (brevirostrine). The third molars typically had 4 to 4.5 lophs/lophids, with some specimens having 5 lophs/lophids, with relatively simple crowns.

Ecology 
Cuvieronius is suggested to have been a generalist mixed feeder that consumed a wide range of plant resources.

Evolution

Cuvieronius initially evolved in North America. It is considered closely related to, if not derived from, Rhynchotherium, a North American gomphothere genus known from the Late Miocene and Pliocene. The oldest remains attributed to the genus from the Blancan are very fragmentary, and may belong to Rhynchotherium instead. The oldest unambiguous records of the genus in North America date to 1.4 million years ago (Ma). Cuvieronius was extirpated from its northern range in North America over the course of the Irvingtonian after the arrival of mammoths in North America around 1.3 Ma, presumably due to competitive exclusion by mammoths and mastodons, but persisted in southern North America and Central America until the very end of the Pleistocene. During the Great American Interchange, Cuvieronius and a relative, Notiomastodon, dispersed into South America. Cuvieronius apparently reached South America considerably later than Notiomastodon, with the oldest possible date being 760 ±30 kya and the oldest confirmed date being 304 ±54 kya, and had a much more restricted range, confined mostly to the Andes.

Distribution and habitat 

In North America Cuvieronius is known from the Southern United States, including Texas, Florida, Arizona, New Mexico and Oklahoma, as well as Mexico. It was also widespread across Central America.

According to a group of Brazilian mammalogists, many sites in South America referred to Cuvieronius actually refer to Notiomastodon, with many previous studies simply labeling fossils one or the other depending on location, with only localities definitely identified as Cuvieronius, the range now extends in the high Andes from Ecuador in the north, to Bolivia in the south, with the localities in the southern Andes in Chile and Argentina now thought to belong to Notiomastodon. The same group maintains that all the South American specimens represent the single species C. hyodon. By the end of the Pleistocene, the northern limit of the range of Cuvieronius was in Mexico and Central Texas. Remains found near the town of Hockley in Texas near Austin, which date to around 24,000 years BP, are the most recent findings north of Mexico.

Cuvieronius were previously suggested to have roamed far south as Chile, with remains initially suggested to represent Cuvieronius at the Quereo I site (Quereo Quebrada) dating to the Late Pleistocene 11,600—11,400 BP. However, more recent studies suggest that all remains from the southern Andes actually belong to Notiomastodon, and Cuvieronius was extirpated from South America by the end of the Late Pleistocene, with its youngest dates on the continent being around 44,000 years ago, before the arrival of people.

Extinction 
Curiveronius became extinct at the end of the Pleistocene, approximately 12,000 years ago as part of the Quaternary extinction event, alongside most other American megafauna, coinciding with the settlement of the Americas. At the El Fin del Mundo kill site in Sonora, Mexico dating to 13,390 years BP, an individual of Cuvierionius was butchered by Clovis culture hunters, suggesting that hunting may have played a role in its extinction.

References

Bibliography

External links 
 American Museum of Natural History Includes images

Gomphotheres
Prehistoric placental genera
Pleistocene proboscideans
Zanclean first appearances
Holocene extinctions
Pliocene proboscideans
Pliocene mammals of North America
Pleistocene mammals of North America
Rancholabrean
Irvingtonian
Blancan
Neogene Mexico
Neogene United States
Pleistocene Costa Rica
Pleistocene El Salvador
Pleistocene Guatemala
Pleistocene Mexico
Pleistocene Nicaragua
Pleistocene Panama
Pleistocene United States
Fossils of Costa Rica
Fossils of El Salvador
Fossils of Guatemala
Fossils of Mexico
Fossils of Nicaragua
Fossils of Panama
Fossils of the United States
Pliocene mammals of South America
Pleistocene mammals of South America
Lujanian
Ensenadan
Uquian
Chapadmalalan
Montehermosan
Neogene Chile
Pleistocene Bolivia
Pleistocene Chile
Pleistocene Colombia
Pleistocene Ecuador
Pleistocene Venezuela
Fossils of Bolivia
Fossils of Chile
Fossils of Colombia
Fossils of Ecuador
Fossils of Venezuela
Fossil taxa described in 1923
Taxa named by Henry Fairfield Osborn